Terry Cahill may refer to:

 Terry Cahill (footballer, born 1955), Australian footballer for Collingwood
 Terry Cahill (footballer, born 1958), Australian footballer for Essendon